Since the schism in 1944 there are two theological universities in Kampen:

University of Kampen may refer to:

Theological University of the Reformed Churches, a seminary in the Dutch city of Kampen
Protestant Theological University, in the Dutch city of Kampen

See also
Kampen (disambiguation)